Thionville Football Club is a French association football club founded in 1905.

They are based in the town of Thionville and their home stadium is the Stade Omnisports of Guentrange.

History
In 1943, Fritz Walter played in the squad, who went on to win the World Cup in 1954 with West Germany.

They turned professionnel whilst in the second division for the two seasons 1979-1980 and 1980-1981. In the latter season they reached the quarter-finals of the French Cup before in the return leg to FC Martigues. They also reached the last 32 in the 1979–80, 1983–84 and 1997–98 seasons.

By the 2009-10 season, they played in the  Group C of the Fifth Division.

Club presidents
Roger Hoffmann
Jean-Marc Plez
Christian Ragni
Jean-Luc Bitard
Pascal Dine
Jean-François Geissler

Managers
1976-1979: Rolland Ehrhardt 
1979-December 1980: Robert Szczepaniak
January 1980-1981: Pierre Flamion
1983-January 1987: Paweł Chodakowski 
February 1987-1987: Branko Tucač 
1992-2000: José Souto
2000-2001: Gabriel Dalvit 
2001-2003: Pascal Raspollini
2003-2006: Patrick Libot 
2006-2007: Gabriel Dalvit 
2008-2010: Eric Brusco 
June 2010-2012: Christophe Borbiconi
November 2013-June 2018: Manu Cuccu 
2019: David Fanzel

Honours
National Fourth Division Champion, Group East: 1984
Lorraine Champions: 1923, 1925, 1928, 1961, 1977, 2009
Honour Division Champions: 1927, 1932, 1938, 2016
Lorraine Cup: 1925, 1929, 1964, 1983, 1993, 2008

Naming history
1905-1919: Fußball-Club Diedenhofen
1919-1940: La Sportive Thionvilloise
1940-1945: Tum-und-Sportgemeinschaft
1945-1981: La Sportive Thionvilloise
1981: Thionville Football Club

References

External links
  - Footeo profile 
 - Official website 

Thionville FC
Association football clubs established in 1905
1905 establishments in France
Sport in Moselle (department)
Football clubs in Grand Est